Frans Adelaar (born 5 December 1960) is a Dutch football manager and former professional player.

He most recently was manager of Dutch top amateur side IJsselmeervogels.

Career

Club career
Adelaar played professional football for FC Utrecht and after that he played for the amateur clubs DOVO and HVV Hollandia.

Managerial career
After retiring as a player in 1993, Adelaar has managed GVVV, FC Utrecht, Akratitos, De Graafschap, ADO Den Haag and FC Volendam. He was appointed by Sparta Rotterdam in May 2009 and dismissed in April 2010.

In April 2012 Adelaar took charge af Slovakian side MŠK Žilina, with whom he won the domestic league and cup double in 2012 but was sacked in January 2013. In March 2014 he was appointed manager of Dutch amateur side IJsselmeervogels until the end of the 2013/14 season. Adelaar was dismissed by IJsselmeervogels in November 2015.

Honours

Player
FC Utrecht
KNVB Cup: 1984–85

Manager
MŠK Žilina
Corgoň Liga (1): 2011-12
Slovak Cup (1): 2012

References

External links
Player profile at Ronald Zwiers  

1960 births
Living people
Footballers from Utrecht (city)
Association football wingers
Dutch footballers
Dutch football managers
FC Utrecht players
FC Utrecht managers
De Graafschap managers
ADO Den Haag managers
FC Volendam managers
Sparta Rotterdam managers
MŠK Žilina managers
Slovak Super Liga managers
Dutch expatriate football managers
Expatriate football managers in Greece
Dutch expatriate sportspeople in Greece
Expatriate football managers in Slovakia
Dutch expatriate sportspeople in Slovakia
VV DOVO players
HVV Hollandia players